Karlo Težak (born 30 October 1993) is a Croatian football midfielder who plays for Austrian fifth-tier side SpG Edelserpentin.

NK Varaždin.

References

External links

NZS profile 

1993 births
Living people
Sportspeople from Varaždin
Association football midfielders
Croatian footballers
Croatia youth international footballers
HNK Gorica players
NK Zavrč players
NK Celje players
NK Međimurje players
NK Varaždin (2012) players
Croatian Football League players
First Football League (Croatia) players
Slovenian PrvaLiga players
Austrian 2. Landesliga players
Croatian expatriate footballers
Expatriate footballers in Slovenia
Croatian expatriate sportspeople in Slovenia
Expatriate footballers in Austria
Croatian expatriate sportspeople in Austria